Al-Mustafa Centre, officially Al-Mustafa Cultural and Educational Centre (AMCEC), is a community organisation based in Bradford, West Yorkshire, England.

Establishment 
The organisation was established by a Pakistani Islamic Scholar, Anwar Ul Mustafa Hamdami. He is the son of the late Shaykh Ul Hadith Ghulam Nabi Hamdami. He is also the elder brother of Mukhtar Ul Mustafa the composer and director of Islamic documentaries and presenter of The Saturday Night Live show on Noor TV. Anwar Ul Mustafa came to UK to take a post as the Imam and khateeb of the Jamia Masjid Hanifa in Bradford in 1998. He established his own organisation in 2002.

Activities 
Al-Mustafa Centre is at the heart of the Girlington Community of Bradford. It carries out a variety of projects and activities for the social, religious, moral and spiritual betterment of the local community. Most notably it has a supplementary school with over 200 students attending daily to learn Arabic and Islamic studies.

The centre is one of few Islamic organisations led and run by young people from the community. For this reason, it has for many years been at the forefront in using innovative means and taking bold steps to carry out its projects.

The centre is also one of few Islamic organisations with an English-speaking Imam who delivers the weekly Jumu'ah lecture. Shaykh Saad al Attas joined the centre in 2009 and took on a permanent role as an Imam and teacher. Shaykh Sa'ad is a well-known English-speaking scholar of the Ahlus Sunnah creed and attends events and conferences throughout the UK delivering lectures.

The centre is also recognised as a provider of classes for adults to learn Islamic subjects such as Tajweed, Hadith, Fiqh, and Aqeedah, and currently has 8 classes running per week for adults. Other activities that the organisation is known for include sports and homework clubs, Community Cohesion Conferences and guest lectures by internationally renowned scholars and annual Mawlid events with nasheed artists from all over the world participating.

Alim course 
Arguably, the centre is best known in the UK, and particularly in the Bradford Sunni Muslim community, as one of the most successful Dar ul Ulooms. The centre has a number of Dars E Nizami (Alim course) classes running from Monday to Friday under the supervision of its Head Imam Mufti Muhammad Fazal Bandyalwi. Mufti Muhammad is the younger brother of Mufti Aslam Bandyalwi, also of Bradford, who is the principal of another notable Dar ul Uloom in Bradford, Jamia Islamia Rizvia. Mufti Muhammad Fazal took on the role of head imam and head of the Alim course in 2005 and has since taught the traditional sciences to students studying at a higher level and training to become Imams in the UK. Mufti Muhammad has a strong reputation amongst scholars as being a very impressive and competent muddaris (teacher) and is particularly recognised for his great grasp of and ability to teach traditional Arabic grammar (Sarf and Nahw) and Hanafi Fiqh.

In 2009, the first six students graduated from the Centre as imams. These include Moulana Wajid Iqbal, Moulana Qari Imran Rizvi, Moulana Hafiz Abdul Samee, Moulana Hafiz Abdul Saeed, and Moulana Abdul Hafeez Aziz. These imams have been a great success story not only for the centre but for the wider Sunni community. Having studied in the UK, they are now themselves teaching the Alim course to other students both at Al-Mustafa and other institutions.

Moulana Hafiz Abdul Samee has gone on to become the Head Imam of Central Madni Mosque in Halifax. The others also have posts as imams and teachers at other institutions in Bradford, including Jamia Tabligh Ul Islam Victor Street, Jamia Muhammadiya, Jamia Tabligh Ul Islam Toller Lane, and Jamia Islamia Rizvia.

Shadhili Tariqa 

The centre is home to many murids (students) of Shaykh Muhammad al-Ya’qoubi, the esteemed and world recognised religious scholar from Syria. The students have weekly gatherings of Dhikr at the centre as well as other classes and events.

References

External links

Minhaj University Lahore - Alumni

Buildings and structures in Bradford
Barelvi